Akatuy katorga prison (Russian: Акатуйская каторжная тюрьма, Akatuyskaya katorzhnaya tyur'ma)  was part of the Nerchinsk katorga system of the Russian Empire, and was situated in today's Alexandrovo-Zavodsky District of Transbaikalia. It was constructed in 1888 at the Akatuyskom mine, what is now the village of New Akatuy (Новый Акатуй). Originally labor convicts (mostly criminal) were used here for extraction of lead-silver ores. After the closing of the Kara katorga in 1890, it became one of the main centers of detention of political prisoners. It was turned into a women's penal camp in 1911 and was finally shut down after the February Revolution of 1917.

George Kennan visited the remnants of the mine in 1885.  He noted, "Lunin, one of the Decembrist conspirators of 1825, lived and died in penal servitude at this mine, and somewhere in the neighborhood lie buried many of the Polish patriots sent to Akatui after the insurrection of 1863.  The Russian Government does not take pains to perpetuate the memory of the political offenders whom it tortures to death in its Siberian prisons, and over moldering bodies of most of them there is not so much as a mound.  If there is in Siberia a more lonely, a more cheerless, a more God-forsaken place than Kara, it is the snowy, secluded valley of Akatui."

References

External links
 Ruins of prison - list of monuments of history, culture and places of memory Chita region (Russian)

1888 establishments in the Russian Empire
Defunct prisons in Russia
History of Siberia
Cultural heritage monuments in Zabaykalsky Krai
Objects of cultural heritage of Russia of federal significance